Chakhmakhly is a town in Armenia.

Chakhmakhly may also refer to:
Çaxmaqlı, a town in Azerbaijan

Seo also
Chakhmak (disambiguation)